Podgorje pod Čerinom is a settlement in the Municipality of Vojnik in eastern Slovenia. It lies in the hills east of Frankolovo. The area is part of the traditional region of Styria. It is now included with the rest of the municipality in the Savinja Statistical Region.

Name
The name of the settlement was changed from Podgorje to Podgorje pod Čerinom in 1953.

References

External links
Podgorje pod Čerinom at Geopedia

Populated places in the Municipality of Vojnik